Nastassia Aliaksandrauna Yatsevich (born 18 January 1985 in Omsk, Russia) is a Belarusian race walker. She competed in the 20 km kilometres event at the 2012 Summer Olympics. In 2019, she competed in the women's 50 kilometres walk at the 2019 World Athletics Championships held in Doha, Qatar. She finished in 12th place.

References

Sportspeople from Omsk
Belarusian female racewalkers
1985 births
Living people
Olympic athletes of Belarus
Athletes (track and field) at the 2012 Summer Olympics
Athletes (track and field) at the 2016 Summer Olympics